Burning Earth is Firewind's second album, released in 2003. The original rhythm section of Brian Harris and Konstantine were replaced by Stian Kristoffersen and Petros Christo, respectively. This was the last album to feature vocalist Stephen Fredrick, who left months after its release. Burning Earth, has been remastered and re-issued in Japan via Hydrant Music in 2012.

Track listing
Original recording

"Steal Them Blind" – 4:58
"I Am the Anger"   – 3:45
"Immortal Lives Young" – 6:50
"Burning Earth"  – 4:00
"The Fire and the Fury" (instrumental)  – 5:24
"You Have Survived"– 5:26
"Brother's Keeper" – 4:40
"Waiting Still"– 4:04
"The Longest Day"  – 5:20
"Still the Winds"  – 2:13 

Remastered Version
"Steal Them Blind" - 5:00
"I Am The Anger" - - 3:48
"Immortal Lives Young" - 6:47
"Burning Earth" - 4:02
"The Fire and The Fury" - 5:26
"You Have Survived" - 5:28
"Brother's Keeper" - 4:42
"Waiting Still" - 4:06
"The Longest Day" - 5:24
"Burning Earth (Demo)" - 4:05
"The Fire and The Fury (Demo)" - 5:23
"You Have Survived (Demo)" - 5:27

Personnel
Band members
 Stephen Fredrick – vocals
 Gus G. – guitars, keyboards
 Petros Christo – bass
 Stian L. Kristoffersen – drums

References

Firewind albums
2003 albums
Massacre Records albums